Lucien Mettomo (born 19 April 1977) is a Cameroonian former professional footballer who played as a defender for Tonnerre Yaoundé, Saint-Étienne, Manchester City, Kaiserslautern, Kayseri Erciyesspor and FC Luzern.

He was part of the Cameroon squad at the 2002 World Cup and the 2004 African Nations Cup. He was also part of the victorious 2000 and 2002 African Cup of Nations squads.

Playing career
Mettomo was born in Douala. He made his name in France, playing for St. Étienne. In September 2001, he signed for Manchester City of the English First Division for a £1.5 million fee. His Manchester City debut came as a substitute in a 6–0 League Cup defeat of Birmingham City. He played 23 league games that season, scoring once against Bradford, helping Manchester City to win the 2001–02 First Division Championship. The following season, Mettomo rarely featured in the first team due to the signing of Sylvain Distin. He made only four Premier League appearances, and in the close season signed for Kaiserslautern of the Bundesliga.

Mettomo went on trial with Norwich City in September 2007, but the club decided not to offer Mettomo a contract due to concerns over his fitness. Later that month, Mettomo signed a short-term deal at English Championship side Southampton that would run until the end of the 2007–08 season; this contract was cancelled in January, however, due to Mettomo's inability to break into the first team.

References

External links
 
 Lucien Mettomo at BBC World Cup 2002

1977 births
Living people
Cameroonian footballers
Cameroon international footballers
Footballers from Douala
AS Saint-Étienne players
Manchester City F.C. players
Southampton F.C. players
1. FC Kaiserslautern players
Kayseri Erciyesspor footballers
Veria F.C. players
FC Luzern players
Ligue 1 players
Ligue 2 players
Premier League players
Bundesliga players
Süper Lig players
Swiss Super League players
Cameroonian expatriate sportspeople in Turkey
Cameroonian expatriate footballers
Expatriate footballers in Germany
Expatriate footballers in Greece
Expatriate footballers in England
Expatriate footballers in Turkey
Expatriate footballers in Switzerland
2002 FIFA World Cup players
2003 FIFA Confederations Cup players
1998 African Cup of Nations players
2000 African Cup of Nations players
2002 African Cup of Nations players
2004 African Cup of Nations players
Association football defenders